Shōji Kojima (小島章司, born October 1, 1939, in Tokushima Prefecture, Japan) is a Japanese flamenco dancer. Along with Yoko Komatsubara, Kojima is credited as instrumental in popularising flamenco in Japan.

Kojima studyied vocal music, piano, classical ballet, and modern ballet at the Musashino Academia Musicae. Originally hoping to become an opera singer, Kojima studied ballet in order to improve his movement. In 1959-1960, Kojima and other future stars of Japanese flamenco witnessed the performance of Pilar López Júlvez and Antonio Gades as they toured Japan. Kojima decided to travel to Spain, now determined to become a flamenco dancer, travelling there by Transsiberian Railway in 1966.  He began training at "Amor de Dios", a legendary flamenco studio. Registered in 1967 as a member of the National Ballet of Spain, he took part in a tour to the Soviet Union on a Hispano-Soviet cultural mission. In 1968 he was noticed by the singer Rafael Farina and debuted as a first dancer in Farina's company long-running performance. His appearance on a Televisión Española's program "Estudio Abierto" in 1970 made him famous in Spain nationwide. During his decade-long stay in Spain he performed on the best tablaos of the country such as "Los Gallos" (Seville), "La Taberna Gitana" (Malaga) to name just a few, and he marked a starting of "El Embrujo" (Seville) with Isabel Pantoja. In 1973 he performed in the welcoming ceremony for the Japan's Crown Prince Naruhito and the Crown Princess Michiko held by Royal Family of Spain at Alcázar of Seville. 

After returning to Japan in 1976, he continued to be active in flamenco, performing a new work every year. In 1980, he set up his own studio in Tokyo in 1980. The Catalan guitarist Chicuelo has been the musical director of all his performances since 1993. In 2007 and 2009 he invited Javier Latorre as director-choreographer for the pieces Poetas en Guerra and La Celestina respectively. On February 27 his company, Ballet Shoji Kojima Flamenco, was invited to perform in the 15th Festival de Jerez with La Celestina en el Teatro Villamarta of the City of Jerez de la Frontera, Spain.

Awards 
 1985  Art Festival Prize by Ministry of Education for Shin-i no homura (flame of wrath)
 1985  18th Dance Critics Society of Japan Prize for Shin-i no homura (flame of wrath)
 1990  Suzuko Kawakami Spanish Dance Prize for Los Gitanos: Amor y Ley (Gypsies: Love and Law) 1998  30th Dance Critics Society of Japan Prize for Homenaje a García Lorca 1999  Tokushima Prefecture Cultural Prize
 2000  Awarded the Minister of Education Award for Fine Arts for Luna (Moon) 2000  Decorated with the Cruz de Oficial de la Reina Isabel (Order of the Queen Isabella in the Grade of Officer)
 2001  33rd Dance Critics Society of Japan Prize for Fantasía Atlántida
 2003  Received the Purple Ribbon Medal from the Emperor of Japan in recognition of his lifelong distinguished services.
 2007  39th Dance Critics Society of Japan Prize for the «love and peace trilogy»: El Cant dels Ocells: A Pau Casals, FEDERICO and Poetas en Guerra 2009  Decorated with Encomienda de la Orden del Mérito Civil (Order of Civil Merit in the Grade of Commander) by the King Juan Carlos I of Spain.
 2009  Person of Cultural Merit
 2009  People's Honour Award of Mugi (Tokushima, Japan)

References

 大久保元春『求道の旅人 小島章司とフラメンコの世界』角川SSコミュニケーションズ、2009年 (Motoharu Okubo, Pilgrim in quest of truth: Shoji Kojima and the world of flamenco'', Kadokawa SSCommunications, 2009)

External links 
 Ballet Shoji Kojima Flamenco
 Entrevista a Shoji Kojima, bailaor
 Shoji Kojima: biografía

1939 births
Japanese male dancers
Living people
Flamenco dancers
People from Tokushima Prefecture